Çavundur is a quarter of the town Kurşunlu, Kurşunlu District, Çankırı Province, Turkey. Its population is 499 (2021). Before the 2013 reorganisation, it was a town (belde).

References

Populated places in Kurşunlu District